The 1989–1990 Scottish Second Division was won by Brechin City who, along with second placed Kilmarnock, were promoted to the First Division. East Stirlingshire finished bottom.

Table

Promoted: Brechin City, Kilmarnock

References

Scottish Second Division seasons
3
Scot